Delroy Scott (22 January 1947 – 24 July 2018) was a Jamaican footballer who played at both professional and international levels as a midfielder. He later coached.

Career
Scott played with Cavalier, and then spent four seasons in the United States with the Atlanta Chiefs, making 69 appearances.

He also spent time with the Jamaican national side, appearing in eight FIFA World Cup qualifying matches.

He later worked as a high school coach.

References

1947 births
2018 deaths
Jamaican footballers
Jamaican expatriate footballers
Jamaica international footballers
Cavalier F.C. players
Atlanta Chiefs players
National Professional Soccer League (1967) players
North American Soccer League (1968–1984) players
Expatriate soccer players in the United States
Jamaican expatriate sportspeople in the United States
Jamaican football managers
Association football midfielders